The dyeing dart frog, dyeing poison dart frog, tinc (a nickname given by those in the hobby of keeping dart frogs), or dyeing poison frog (Dendrobates tinctorius) is a species of poison dart frog. This species is distributed throughout the eastern portion of the Guiana Shield and Venezuela, including parts of Guyana, Suriname, Brazil, and nearly all of French Guiana.

Etymology
The specific name, tinctorius, comes, however not from the variety of colors, but from the legends of some indigenous tribes. It has been said that tribe members used the frog poisons to cause green parrot feathers to grow different colors.

Poison
Like most species of the genus Dendrobates, D. tinctorius is highly toxic if consumed. It produces pumiliotoxins and allopumiliotoxins that the frog uses for self-defense. While pumiliotoxins are weaker than their derivative allopumiliotoxins and the batrachotoxins secreted by Phyllobates species, they are sufficiently toxic to discourage most animals from feeding on them. In the case of D. tinctorius, the toxins cause pain, cramping, and stiffness when the frogs are handled roughly. Due to the toxins of the frogs, animals that feed on D. tinctorius will typically learn to associate the bright colours of such frogs with the vile taste and pain that occurs after a frog is ingested. As it is such a variable species, different color morphs of D. tinctorius have varying degrees of toxicity and many can cause serious effects on humans including death.

In the northwest of the Brazilian Amazon rainforest, there was a report of envenomation by this species. The patients were two photographers, 47 and 30 years old. One photographer quickly captured the frog and held it for about five seconds with his own hands, before releasing it and washing his hands in a nearby stream. The other photographer kept the frog from moving by placing both his hands on top. Neither of them suffered hand injuries. Both photographed the tree-frog for about five minutes without touching it again. However, 20 minutes after the first contact, the photographer who initially handled it began to feel numbness in his right arm, mainly at the height of the forearm. The other photographer, who after taking photos had touched his mouth without first washing his hands, felt a slight numbness in his lower lip. After 40 minutes, they no longer felt symptoms.  Their symptoms could have been aggravated if the contact with the animal had lasted longer or if there had been a wound at the points of contact.

The main alkaloid carried by this species is pumiliotoxin (PTX), which is highly toxic. PTX interferes with the muscle contractions by affecting the calcium channels, causing locomotor difficulties, clonic convulsions, paralysis or even death. D. tinctorius toxin can lead to cardio-respiratory problems, mainly through the neurotoxic action, which affects the sodium and potassium channels, impairing the muscle contraction, and consequently, the heart and breathing muscles.

Description

The dyeing poison dart frog is large for a poison dart frog, but may be smaller than Phyllobates terribilis and Ameerega trivittata. Many small forms of D. tinctorius reach 3.5 cm long; most morphs are around 5 cm in length or slightly bigger; some of the larger morphs may exceed 7 cm, although large ones are usually closer to 5.5 cm long. For some time, captive individuals were thought to be incapable of reaching the sizes of wild specimens; however, later evidence suggested captive individuals do not reach their maximum potential size possibly due to vitamin and mineral deficiencies. More recently, breeders had success raising dyeing poison dart frogs to very large sizes.

Dendrobates tinctorius is one of the most variable of all poison dart frogs. Typically, the body is primarily black, with an irregular pattern of yellow or white stripes running along the back, flanks, chest, head, and belly. In some morphs, however, the body may be primarily blue (as in the "azureus" morph, formerly treated as a separate species), primarily yellow, or primarily white. The legs range from pale blue, sky blue or blue-gray to royal blue, cobalt blue, navy blue, or royal purple and are typically peppered with small black dots. The "Matecho" morph is almost entirely yellow and with some black, with only a few specks of white on the toes. Another unique morph, the citronella morph, is primarily golden yellow with tiny splotches of black on its belly and royal blue legs that have no black dots.

Males are typically smaller and more slender than females, but they have larger toe discs. The toe discs of female dyeing poison dart frogs are circular while those of the males are heart-shaped. Also the females have arched backs as opposed to males who have curved ones.

Distribution
It exists in discrete patches throughout this region, being restricted to "highland" (up to ) areas. While this species can be found at sea level, individuals have been collected at the base of nearby hills or mountains. The isolation of populations has presumably occurred as a result of the erosion of these highland areas and the seasonal inundation of the inter-patch areas. Study shows that Dendrobates tinctorius tadpoles can survive in pools having a high level of KH, vertical height of 15 meters and salinity up to 955 ppm.

Morphs
The species encompasses a great diversity of color and patterning variants (subspecies and morphs). Some batrachologists suspect that some of these are actually different species.

References

Sources
  Database entry includes a range map and a brief justification of why this species is of least concern

Further reading

External links

Caring for Your Dyeing Dart Frogs (Dendrobates tinctorius)

Dendrobates
Amphibians of Brazil
Amphibians of French Guiana
Amphibians of Guyana
Amphibians of Suriname
Amphibians described in 1797
Taxa named by Georges Cuvier